K-car may refer to:

 Chrysler K platform, an American automobile platform
 Plymouth Reliant and Dodge Aries, known as K-cars 
 Vehicles used on SEPTA's subway–surface trolleys built by Kawasaki in 1981
 HR 4138, a star in the constellation Carina with Bayer designation K Carinae, abbreviated K Car
 "K Car", a song by Relient K from the 2000 album Relient K
 K-car, nickname of a helicopter in the Rhodesian Fireforce configuration

See also
 KCAR (disambiguation)
 Chevrolet C/K, a series of trucks 1962–1998
 Kei car, a Japanese category of small automobiles